Jeffrey David Thomason (born December 30, 1969) is a former American football tight end.

First NFL stint 
After playing college football at Oregon, he was signed as an undrafted free agent by the Cincinnati Bengals in 1992. He played for the Bengals, Green Bay Packers, and Philadelphia Eagles, primarily as a reserve player, for ten years. He retired in 2002.

Second NFL stint 
Thomason returned to the spotlight before Super Bowl XXXIX when he was re-signed by the Eagles three years after his retirement in order to temporarily replace injured tight end Chad Lewis. After seeing a few plays of action during the Eagles' loss in that game, he retired once again that summer, returning to the construction business he had been working at before he was re-signed.

References

1969 births
American football tight ends
Cincinnati Bengals players
Green Bay Packers players
Living people
Oregon Ducks football players
Philadelphia Eagles players
Players of American football from San Diego